Michelle Khare (born August 10, 1992) is an American YouTuber, television host, actress and a former professional cyclist.  She is best known for her YouTube show Challenge Accepted and HBO Max's Karma.

Career
Khare attended Dartmouth College in a mixed subject study in Digital Media and Technology. During her studies, she interned at a variety of high-profile companies including Google, DreamWorks Animation, and Carousel Productions.

Road Cycling 
While living in Los Angeles for her internships, Khare began road and mountain cycling recreationally. She went on to join the Dartmouth Cycling Team and win US U23 Criterium nationals in 2014. She joined the BMW Women's Professional Team where she trained and raced professionally for the 2014–2015 season.

YouTube and Buzzfeed 
Khare credits her younger sister with inspiring her to start a YouTube channel. As she describes her sister's words: "If you want to do entertainment, you should make a YouTube channel. And you should do it about something that nobody else can do: cycling comedy."

After graduation in 2014, Khare applied for an opening to be a full-time content producer at BuzzFeed. She considers her YouTube channel and early videos to have helped in getting the position at BuzzFeed Video. While working at Buzzfeed there were heavy restrictions on content creators on their own channels because of potential conflict of interest, so her own channel remained dormant. While working at Buzzfeed she continued her cycling career and incorporated it into her content, focusing on exploring health and wellness. After she stopped cycling professionally she was able to begin partaking in extreme physical challenges.

When she left Buzzfeed in 2016, she began focusing on her own channel again. Her most popular series is Challenge Accepted, where she tries out grueling training regimens for various professions. Her channel has 3.01 million subscribers as of September 2022.

On December 12, 2020, Khare released her own version of the YouTube Rewind videos, but it was taken down after fans criticized the video for including a portrayal of Jenna Marbles, who left the platform that year after she was involved in several controversies.

Television
She is a host of the children's competition program Karma that was released on the HBO Max streaming platform on June 18, 2020.

Personal life
Khare grew up in Shreveport, Louisiana.  Her father is Indian-American and her mother is of Irish descent. She has one sister, Madeline, born in 1996. She married her longtime boyfriend, Garrett Kennell on October 17, 2022.

Boxing record

Awards and nominations

Notes

References

1992 births
Living people
Entertainment-related YouTube channels
People from Shreveport, Louisiana
Dartmouth College alumni
American YouTubers
American people of Irish descent
American people of Indian descent
BuzzFeed people